Felicia aethiopica is a low shrublet of up to about  high that is assigned to the family Asteraceae. It has rigid, leathery, inverted egg-shaped leaves, with only the lowest pair set oppositely. The plant is called wild aster or dwarf Felicia in English, and wilde-aster or  bloublombossie in Afrikaans. Flowering occurs year-round. Wild aster can be found in the Western and Eastern Cape provinces of South Africa.

Description 
Its shoots are loosely hairy to glandular. The lower stems are covered by reddish bark. The rigidly leathery leaves mostly set alternately along the stems, only those at base are oppositely set (rarely also higher on the shoot opposite), usually standing out at a straight angle, those lower on the stem even often weakly descending.

The flower heads sit individually on the clearly distinguished inflorescence stalks that are mostly richly glandular near the top. In the center of each corolla are five free filaments and five anthers merged into a tube, through which the style grows when the floret opens, hoovering up the pollen on its shaft. At the tip of both style branches is a triangular appendage.

Felicia aethiopica subsp. ecklonis differs in having entirely hairy cypselae.

Differences with related species 
Felicia aethiopica is often confused with Felicia amoena and Felicia amelloides. F. aethiopica is a woody shrublet with mostly only the lowest pair of leaves opposite and the remainder alternate, twelve to fourteen ray florets and also can be distinguished by the three resin ducts in the involucral bracts, that lack in both other species. F. amoena is a biennial or perennial plant with at least the lowest four to six leaves in pairs as well as those at each branching, and the remainder alternate and may have up to twenty five ray florets. F. amelloides is a mostly perennial plant with all its leaves in pairs and about twelve ray florets.

Taxonomy 
The wild aster was first described in 1768 by Nicolaas Laurens Burman, based on a specimen in the herbarium collection of his father, the Dutch botanist and physician Johannes Burman, that had been collected at Caput Bonae Spei, a term used for the southwest of the Cape Province. He named it Aster aethiopicus. Henri Cassini in 1817 described Agathaea microphylla. In 1822, Kurt Polycarp Joachim Sprengel described Cineraria trachyphylla. In 1832, Christian Friedrich Lessing described Aster ecklonis. He also described Aster capensis, based on a herbarium sheet that contains one twig of Felicia aethiopica and two twigs of F. amelloides, and this has since created much confusion. Cassini's taxon was reassigned to the genus Cineraria by Jens Vahl, who created the combination C. microphylla in 1836. Carl Heinrich 'Bipontinus' Schultz described a slightly different plant in 1843, calling it Agathaea kraussii, but he demoted it a year later to Agathaea amelloides β kraussii. In 1865, William Henry Harvey, reassigned Schultz’ taxon to Aster, creating A. kraussii, but he also described Aster aethiopicus var. glandulosus. Bolus and Anthony Hurt Wolley-Dod assign the species to the genus Felicia in 1950, creating the combination Felicia aethiopica. Jürke Grau in his 1973 Revision of the genus Felicia (Asteraceae), considered tall these names synonymous, except for Aster ecklonis Less., that he considered a subspecies, calling it F. aethiopica subsp. ecklonis. The species is considered to be part of the section Neodetris.

The species name Latin aethiopica is a Latin word meaning "relating to Ethiopia or Africa in general".

Distribution, habitat and ecology 
Felicia aethiopica subsp. aethiopica has the smaller distribution of the subspecies. It is restricted to the Cape Peninsula, the Kogelberg area, the neighborhood of Hermanus and Gansbaai, the Potberg and near Swellendam. Subsp. ecklonis stretches from the Cedarberg in the north via the mountains near Porterville to Riviersonderend and Witsand to Natal. It grows on sandy or rocky flats and slopes.

Conservation 
The continued survival of both subspecies of Felicia aethiopica is considered to be of least concern because their populations are stable.

References

External links 
 Line drawing of Felicia aethiopica ecklonis
 Distribution maps of both subspecies of Felicia aethiopica

amoena
Endemic flora of South Africa
Plants described in 1768
Taxa named by Nicolaas Laurens Burman